Michael Spencer is an English record producer and recording engineer, who has worked with pop acts ranging from Newton Faulkner to Emeli Sandé. Many of his productions have achieved platinum certification, and have won MOBO and Brit Awards, as well as being nominated for Mercury Prizes.

Selected discography

Singles
2022: "Ghostin" - Cat Burns
2022: "Emotionally Unavailable" - Cat Burns
2022: "My Brother" - Sam Tompkins
2021: "Skylight" - Gabrielle Aplin
2021: "We Cry" - JP Cooper
2019: "Losing Me" - Gabrielle Aplin, JP Cooper
2019: "Walk Away" - Four of Diamonds
2018: "Walk Alone" - Rudimental featuring Tom Walker (Vocal production)
2018: "Angels" - Tom Walker
2017: "My Lover" - Mabel with Not3s
2016: "September Song"  - JP Cooper
2016:  "Ain't My Fault"  - Zara Larsson
2016: "Cruel" - Snakehips featuring Zayn Malik (Mix)
2016: "Surprise Yourself' - Jack Garratt
2015: "Miss You" - Gabrielle Aplin
2015: "Weathered" - Jack Garratt
2015: "Eyes Shut" - Years & Years
2015: "Lay It All on Me" - Rudimental featuring Ed Sheeran
2014: "Let It Be" - Labrinth
2014: "Glorious" - Foxes
2014: "Holding Onto Heaven" - Foxes 
2013: "Free" - Rudimental featuring Emeli Sandé
2013: "Let Go for Tonight" - Foxes 
2013: "Love Me Again" - John Newman
2013: "Please Don't Say You Love Me" - Gabrielle Aplin
2012: "Figure 8" - Ellie Goulding
2012:  "The Power of Love"- Gabrielle Aplin
2012: "Not Giving In" - Rudimental
2012: "Clouds" - Newton Faulkner
2012: "Feel the Love" - Rudimental
2012: "Express Yourself" - Labrinth
2011: "Heaven" - Emeli Sandé
2011: "Down With the Trumpets" - Rizzle Kicks
2011: "Me Without You" - Loick Essien
2011: "Too Close" - Alex Clare
2010: "Once" - Diana Vickers
2009: "If This Is It (song)"– Newton Faulkner
2008: "Boyfriend" - Alphabeat
2007: "Runaway"' – Jamiroquai
2007: "Teardrop" – Newton Faulkner
2007: "Dream Catch Me" – Newton Faulkner
2007: "What Am I Fighting For?" – Unklejam
2005: "Feels Just Like It Should" – Jamiroquai
2005: "Seven Days in Sunny June" – Jamiroquai
2005: "(Don't) Give Hate a Chance" – Jamiroquai
2002: "Shoulda Woulda Coulda" - Beverley Knight
2000: "Spinning Around" – Kylie Minogue
1999: "Greatest Day" - Beverley Knight

Albums (contributed to)
2020: Dear Happy - Gabrielle Aplin
2019: What a Time to Be Alive - Tom Walker
2017: Raised Under Grey Skies - JP Cooper
2017: Automaton - Jamiroquai
2017: So Good - Zara Larsson
2016: You're a Man Now, Boy - Raleigh Ritchie
2016: Phase - Jack Garratt
2015: Communion - Years & Years
2015: We the Generation - Rudimental
2014: Glorious - Foxes
2013: Tribute - John Newman
2013: English Rain - Gabrielle Aplin
2013: Home - Rudimental 
2012: Halcyon (album) - Ellie Goulding
2012: Electronic Earth - Labrinth
2012: Our Version of Events - Emeli Sandé (Heaven)
2011: Stereo Typical - Rizzle Kicks
2011: The Lateness of the Hour - Alex Clare
2010: Songs From The Tainted Cherry Tree - Diana Vickers (Once)
2009: Rebuilt by Humans – Newton Faulkner
2008: Let It Go - Will Young 
2008: This Is Alphabeat - Alphabeat
2007: Hand Built By Robots – Newton Faulkner
2007: Unklejam – Unklejam
2007: High Times: Singles 1992-2006 – Jamiroquai 
2007: Oi Va Voi – Oi Va Voi
2005: Dynamite – Jamiroquai
2002: Who I Am – Beverley Knight
2001: Signs – Badmarsh and Shri
2000: Light Years – Kylie Minogue (Spinning Around)

References

External links
Mikespencer.com - Official Site
Discogs.com - Discogs Entry

English record producers
Living people
Year of birth missing (living people)